Burundi is situated in East Africa and has a territory full of mountains, savannas and agricultural fields, with forests in the surrounding rivers and waters. Agriculture is spread on 80% of the country's surface and it mainly includes coffee, tea, maize, beans and manioc. Due to these characteristics, Burundi cuisine is very representative of the African culinary culture, as it includes beans, which are the staple of Burundi cooking, exotic fruits (mainly bananas), plantains, sweet potatoes, cassava, peas, maize and cereals, like corn and wheat. 

A major aspect when discussing Burundian cuisine is based on the economic conditions of the country: the Burundian people usually eat homemade food, from homemade vessels also used for drinking, carrying water and storing grain. Food security remains a major problem in Burundi.

See also 
 African cuisine

Ingredients 
Most of Burundi's dishes are soups that consist of a variety of foods, spices, and herbs such as:

 Banana
 Beans
 Cabbage
 Corn
 Plantains
 Sweet potato
 Goat
 Sheep
 Fish
 Onions
 Palm oil
 Pepper
 Salt

Typical dishes 

 Ugali—maize or cassava flour porridge
 Curry
 Maharagwe—bean soup
 Ibiharage—fried beans
 Beans and bananas
 Bean soup
 Matura and mahu—type of sausage
 Boko Boko harees

 References This article uses material from the "Burundian Cuisine" at Recipes Wiki and is licensed under the Creative Commons Attribution-Share Alike License'' 

 
 
 

 
Burundian culture
Burundi